D.L. Evans Bank is an American retail bank headquartered in Burley, Idaho. It operates brach offices in southern Idaho and northern Utah.

History

The bank was founded on September 15, 1904, in Albion, Idaho, by David Lloyd (D.L.) Evans and a group of southern Idaho businessmen. In 1910, the bank moved to a two-story stone building in Albion, where it stayed for 60 years. The recession of the 1930s closed most banks in Idaho, but D.L. Evans Bank survived, continuing to provide customers with essential financial services. The Burley branch opened in 1979, with John V. Evans Jr., a great-grandson of the founder, as manager.

On December 31, 1986, Evans Jr. became CEO and announced that his father, then-governor John V. Evans Sr., would join the bank as president after his term as governor was completed. John Sr., fondly known as "the Gov," held public office for more than 35 years.  He ended his second term as governor on January 5, 1987, having held the office for 10 years. His background in banking, farming, ranching, and government helped him lead D.L. Evans Bank into the 21st century. Evans Sr. served as president of the bank until his death in July 2014. Don S. Evans Sr. became chairman of the board in 1976 and continued to serve until his death in April 2016.

, the bank claims more than $2.9 billion in assets with 38 full-service branches.

Branch locations
As of 2019, the bank had branch locations in the following communities:

Idaho

Albion
Ammon
Blackfoot
Boise
Burley
Caldwell
Eagle
Fruitland
Hailey
Idaho Falls
Jerome
Ketchum
Meridian
Nampa
Pocatello
Rupert
Twin Falls

Utah

South Ogden
Tremonton

Notes

References

External links 

1904 establishments in Idaho
Banks established in 1904
Banks based in Idaho
Companies based in Idaho
Privately held companies based in Idaho